Galahitiyawa Central College (GCC) is a National school in Ganemulla, Sri Lanka belonging to the category of Central Colleges of Sri Lanka. It was established in May 1944. It is one of the original 54 Central Schools established by Dr. C.W.W.Kannangara, the then Minister of Education, in the implementation of his free education scheme.
Students are admitted to grade six on the basis of results of The Scholarship Examination in Sri Lanka.

History 
In 1944 under Dr. C.W.W.Kannangara Central School scheme this school was started. Galahitiyawa Central College is one of the original 54 Central Schools established in the island.

Houses 
The students are divided into four houses:

Students participate in an annual inter-house sport meet under these houses to improve their skills and to buildup their character in general.

Big Match 
Galahitiyawa Central College Annual Big Match Enounter is played against Dudley Senanayake Central College, Tholangamuwa. witnessed by over six thousand spectators who traveled all the way from Gampaha and Kegalle.

Notable alumni

References

External links
Official Facebook page
Official Twitter profile
Official GCC Past Pupils' website

Schools in Gampaha District
National schools in Sri Lanka